This page shows the results of the Cycling Competition at the 1959 Pan American Games, held from August 27 to September 7, 1959 in Chicago, United States. There were a total number of five medal events, with only men competing.

Men's competition

Men's 1000 m Match Sprint (Track)

Men's 1000 m Time Trial (Track)

Men's 4000 m Team Pursuit (Track)

Men's Individual Race (Road)

Men's Team Race (Road)

References
Results

1959
Events at the 1959 Pan American Games
Pan American Games
Pan American Games
Pan American Games
1959 Pan American Games
Cycling in Chicago